Japanese is an agglutinative, synthetic, mora-timed language with simple phonotactics, a pure vowel system, phonemic vowel and consonant length, and a lexically significant pitch-accent. Word order is normally subject–object–verb with particles marking the grammatical function of words, and sentence structure is topic–comment. Its phrases are exclusively head-final and compound sentences are exclusively left-branching. Sentence-final particles are used to add emotional or emphatic impact, or make questions. Nouns have no grammatical number or gender, and there are no articles. Verbs are conjugated, primarily for tense and voice, but not person. Japanese adjectives are also conjugated. Japanese has a complex system of honorifics with verb forms and vocabulary to indicate the relative status of the speaker, the listener, and persons mentioned.

In language typology, it has many features different from most European languages.

Distinctive aspects of modern Japanese sentence structure

Word order: head-final and left-branching
The modern theory of constituent order ("word order"), usually attributed to Joseph Harold Greenberg, identifies several kinds of phrases. Each one has a head and possibly a modifier. The head of a phrase either precedes its modifier (head-initial) or follows it (head-final). Some of these phrase types, with the head marked in boldface, are:
genitive phrase, i.e., noun modified by another noun ("the cover of the book", "the book's cover");
noun governed by an adposition ("on the table", "underneath the table");
comparison ("[X is] bigger than Y", i.e., "compared to Y, X is big").
noun modified by an adjective ("black cat").

Some languages are inconsistent in constituent order, having a mixture of head-initial phrase types and head-final phrase types. Looking at the preceding list, English for example is mostly head-initial, but nouns follow the adjectives which modify them. Moreover, genitive phrases can be either head-initial or head-final in English. By contrast, the Japanese language is consistently head-final:
genitive phrase:

noun governed by an adposition:

comparison:

noun modified by an adjective:

Head-finality in Japanese sentence structure carries over to the building of sentences using other sentences. In sentences that have other sentences as constituents, the subordinated sentences (relative clauses, for example), always precede what they refer to, since they are modifiers and what they modify has the syntactic status of phrasal head.  Translating the phrase "the man who was walking down the street" into Japanese word order would be "street down walking was man".

Head-finality prevails also when sentences are coordinated instead of subordinated. In the world's languages, it is common to avoid repetition between coordinated clauses by optionally deleting a constituent common to the two parts, as in "Bob bought his mother some flowers and his father a tie", where the second bought is omitted. In Japanese, such "gapping" must proceed in the reverse order: "Bob mother for some flowers and father for tie bought". The particle  turns a statement into a question, while the others express the speaker's attitude towards the statement.

Word class system
Japanese has five major lexical word classes:
 nouns
 verbal nouns (correspond to English gerunds like 'studying', 'jumping', which denote activities)
 nominal adjectives (names vary, also called -adjectives or "adjectival nouns")
 verbs
 adjectives (so-called -adjectives)
More broadly, there are two classes: uninflectable (nouns, including verbal nouns and nominal adjectives) and inflectable (verbs, with adjectives as defective verbs). To be precise, a verbal noun is simply a noun to which  can be appended, while an adjectival noun is like a noun but uses  instead of  when acting attributively. Compare  →  and  → .

Some scholars, such as Eleanor Harz Jorden, refer to adjectives instead as adjectivals, since they are grammatically distinct from adjectives: they can predicate a sentence.

The two inflected classes, verb and adjective, are closed classes, meaning they do not readily gain new members. Instead, new and borrowed verbs and adjectives are conjugated periphrastically as verbal noun +  (e.g. ) and adjectival noun + . This differs from Indo-European languages, where verbs and adjectives are open classes, though analogous "do" constructions exist, including English "do a favor", "do the twist" or French "faire un footing" (do a "footing", go for a jog), and periphrastic constructions are common for other senses, like "try climbing" (verbal noun) or "try parkour" (noun). Other languages where verbs are a closed class include Basque: new Basque verbs are only formed periphrastically. Conversely, pronouns are closed classes in Western languages but open classes in Japanese and some other East Asian languages.

In a few cases new verbs are created by appending  suffix to a noun or using it to replace the end of a word. This is most often done with borrowed words, and results in a word written in a mixture of katakana (stem) and hiragana (inflectional ending), which is otherwise very rare.

Japanese adjectives are unusual in being closed class but quite numerous – about 700 adjectives – while most languages with closed class adjectives have very few. Some believe this is due to a grammatical change of inflection from an aspect system to a tense system, with adjectives predating the change.

The conjugation of -adjectives has similarities to the conjugation of verbs, unlike Western languages where inflection of adjectives, where it exists, is more likely to have similarities to the declension of nouns. Verbs and adjectives being closely related is unusual from the perspective of English, but is a common case across languages generally, and one may consider Japanese adjectives as a kind of stative verb.

Japanese vocabulary has a large layer of Chinese loanwords, nearly all of which go back more than one thousand years, yet virtually none of them are verbs or "-adjectives" – they are all nouns, of which some are verbal nouns and some are adjectival nouns.

Verbal nouns are uncontroversially nouns, having only minor syntactic differences to distinguish them from pure nouns like 'mountain'. Nominal adjectives have more syntactic differences versus pure nouns, and traditionally were considered more separate, but they, too, are ultimately a subcategory of nouns.

There are a few minor word classes that are related to adjectival nouns, namely the  adjectives and  adjectives. Of these,  adjectives are fossils of earlier forms of  adjectives (the  adjectives of Old Japanese), and are typically classed separately, while  adjectives are a parallel class (formerly  adjectives in Late Old Japanese), but are typically classed with  adjectives.

Japanese as a topic-prominent language
In discourse pragmatics, the term topic refers to what a section of discourse is about. At the beginning of a section of discourse, the topic is usually unknown, in which case it is usually necessary to explicitly mention it. As the discourse carries on, the topic need not be the grammatical subject of each new sentence.

Starting with Middle Japanese, the grammar evolved so as to explicitly distinguish topics from nontopics. This is done by two distinct particles (short words which do not change form). Consider the following pair of sentences:

Both sentences translate as "the sun rises". In the first sentence  is not a discourse topic—not yet; in the second sentence it is a discourse topic. In linguistics (specifically, in discourse pragmatics) a sentence such as the second one (with ) is termed a presentational sentence because its function in the discourse is to present sun as a topic, to "broach it for discussion". To better explain the difference, the translation of the second sentence can be enlarged to "As for the sun, it rises" or "Speaking of the sun, it rises"; these renderings reflect a discourse fragment in which "the sun" is being established as the topic of an extended discussion.

Liberal omission of the subject of a sentence
The grammatical subject is commonly omitted in Japanese, as in

Subjects are mentioned when a topic is introduced, or in situations where an ambiguity might result from their omission. The preceding example sentence would most likely be uttered in the middle of a discourse, where who it is that "went to Japan" will be clear from what has already been said (or written).

Sentences, phrases and words
Like Chinese and classical Korean, written Japanese does not typically demarcate words with spaces; its agglutinative nature further makes the concept of a word rather different from words in English. The reader identifies word divisions by semantic cues and a knowledge of phrase structure. Phrases have a single meaning-bearing word, followed by a string of suffixes, auxiliary verbs and particles to modify its meaning and designate its grammatical role.

Some scholars romanize Japanese sentences by inserting spaces only at phrase boundaries (i.e., ""), treating an entire phrase as a single word. This represents an almost purely phonological conception of where one word ends and the next begins. There is some validity in taking this approach: phonologically, the postpositional particles merge with the structural word that precedes them, and within a phonological phrase, the pitch can have at most one fall.

Phrasal movement
In Japanese, phrasal constituents can be moved to the beginning or the end of the sentence. Leftward movement of a phrasal constituent is referred to as "scrambling".

Word classification
In linguistics generally, words and affixes are often classified into two major word categories: lexical words, those that refer to the world outside of a discourse, and function words—also including fragments of words—which help to build the sentence in accordance with the grammar rules of the language. Lexical words include nouns, verbs, adjectives, adverbs, and sometimes prepositions and postpositions, while grammatical words or word parts include everything else. The native tradition in Japanese grammar scholarship seems to concur in this view of classification.

Classical Japanese had some auxiliary verbs (i.e., they were independent words) which have become grammaticized in modern Japanese as inflectional suffixes, such as the past tense suffix  (which might have developed as a contraction of ).

Traditional scholarship proposes a system of word classes differing somewhat from the above-mentioned. The "independent" words have the following categories.
 , word classes which have inflections
 , verbs,
 , -type adjectives.
 , -type adjectives
 , nouns
 , pronouns
 , adverbs
 , conjunctions
 , interjections
 , prenominals

There is not wide agreement among linguists as to the English translations of the above terms.

Controversy over the characterization of nominal adjectives
Uehara (1998) observes that Japanese grammarians have disagreed as to the criteria that make some words inflectional and others not, in particular, the nominal adjectives –  or -adjectives. (It is not disputed that nouns like  'book' are non-inflectional and that verbs and -adjectives are inflectional.) The claim that nominal adjectives are inflectional rests on the claim that the element , regarded as a copula by proponents of non-inflectional nominal adjectives, is really a suffix—an inflection. That is,  is a one-word sentence, not a two-word sentence, .

(1) Reduplication for emphasis

 (the adjectival inflection  cannot be left off)
 (the verbal inflection  cannot be left off)
(2) Questions. In Japanese, questions are formed by adding the particle  (or in colloquial speech, just by changing the intonation of the sentence).

 ( cannot be left off)
 ( cannot be left off)
(3) Several epistemic modality predicates, e.g., 

 ( cannot be left off)
 ( cannot be left off)

On the basis of such constructions, Uehara finds that the copula  is not suffixal and that nominal adjectives pattern with nouns in being non-inflectional.

Similarly, Eleanor Jorden considers this class of words a kind of nominal, not adjective, and refers to them as -nominals in her textbook Japanese: The Spoken Language.

Nouns

Japanese has no grammatical gender, number, or articles; though the demonstrative , is often translatable as "the". Thus, linguists agree that Japanese nouns are noninflecting:  can be translated as "cat", "cats", "a cat", "the cat", "some cats" and so forth, depending on context. However, as part of the extensive pair of grammatical systems that Japanese possesses for honorification (making discourse deferential to the addressee or even to a third party) and politeness, nouns too can be modified. A few examples are given in the following table. In a few cases, there is suppletion, as with the first of the examples given below, 'rice'.

Lacking number, Japanese does not differentiate between count and mass nouns. Reduplication is not productive. Words in Japanese referring to more than one of something are collectives, not plurals. , for example, means "a lot of people" or "people in general"; it is never used to mean "two people". A phrase like  would be taken to mean "the people of Edo", or "the population of Edo", not "two people from Edo" or even "a few people from Edo". Similarly,  means "many mountains".

A limited number of nouns have collective forms that refer to groups of people. Examples include ; ; . One uncommon personal noun, has a much more common reduplicative collective form: .

These are, again, not pluralizing suffixes:  does not mean "some number of people named Taro", but instead indicates the group including Taro. Depending on context,  might be translated into "Taro and his friends", "Taro and his siblings", "Taro and his family", or any other logical grouping that has Taro as the representative. Some words with collectives have become fixed phrases and (commonly) refer to one person.

Grammatical case
Grammatical cases in Japanese are marked by particles placed after the nouns. A distinctive feature of Japanese is the presence of two cases which are roughly equivalent to the nominative case in other languages: one representing the sentence topic, other representing the subject. The most important case markers are the following:

 Nominative –  for subject,  for the topic
 Genitive – 
 Dative – 
 Accusative – 
 Lative – , used for destination direction (like in "to some place")
 Ablative – , used for source direction (like in "from some place")
 Instrumental/Locative–

Pronouns

Although many grammars and textbooks mention , Japanese lacks true pronouns. ( can be considered a subset of nouns.) Strictly speaking, linguistic pronouns do not take modifiers, but Japanese  do. For example,  is valid in Japanese. Also, unlike true pronouns, Japanese  are not closed-class; new  are introduced and old ones go out of use relatively quickly.

A large number of  referring to people are translated as pronouns in their most common uses. Examples: ; ; ; see also the adjoining table or a longer list.

Like other subjects, personal  are seldom used and are de-emphasized in Japanese. This is partly because Japanese sentences do not always require explicit subjects, and partly because names or titles are often used where pronouns would appear in a translation:

The following pair of examples from Bart Mathias illustrates one such constraint.

Reflexive pronouns
English has a reflexive form of each personal pronoun (himself, herself, itself, themselves, etc.); Japanese, in contrast, has one main reflexive , namely , which can also mean 'I'. The uses of the reflexive (pro)nouns in the two languages are very different, as demonstrated by the following literal translations (*=impossible, ??=ambiguous):

In practice the main action is not always discernible, in which case such sentences are ambiguous.

Other uses of the reflexive pronoun in English are covered by adverbs like  which is used in the sense of "by oneself". For example,

Change in a verb's valency is not accomplished by use of reflexive pronouns (in this Japanese is like English but unlike many other European languages). Instead, separate (but usually related) intransitive verbs and transitive verbs are used. There is no longer any productive morphology to derive transitive verbs from intransitive ones, or vice versa.

Demonstratives
 irregular formation
 colloquially contracted to -cchi
  is represented by 

With , demonstratives turn into the corresponding interrogative form. Demonstratives can also be used to refer to people, for example

When demonstratives are used to refer to things not visible to the speaker or the hearer, or to (abstract) concepts, they fulfill a related but different anaphoric role. The anaphoric distals are used for shared information between the speaker and the listener.

 instead of  would imply that B does not share this knowledge about Sapporo, which is inconsistent with the meaning of the sentence. The anaphoric medials are used to refer to experience or knowledge that is not shared between the speaker and listener.

Again,  is inappropriate here because Sato does not (did not) know Tanaka personally. The proximal demonstratives do not have clear anaphoric uses. They can be used in situations where the distal series sound too disconnected:

Conjugable words

Stem forms
Conjugative suffixes and auxiliary verbs are attached to the stem forms of the affixee. In modern Japanese, there are six stem forms, ordered following from the  endings that these forms have in  verbs (according to the  collation order of Japanese), where terminal and attributive forms are the same for verbs (hence only 5 surface forms), but differ for nominals, notably -nominals.
   (and ) is used for plain negative (of verbs), causative and passive constructions. The most common use of this form is with the  auxiliary that turns verbs into their negative (predicate) form. (See Verbs below.)
   is used in a linking role (a kind of serial verb construction). This is the most productive stem form, taking on a variety of endings and auxiliaries, and can even occur independently in a sense similar to the  ending. This form is also used to negate adjectives.
   is used at the ends of clauses in predicate positions.
   is prefixed to nominals and is used to define or classify the noun, similar to a relative clause in English. In modern Japanese it is practically identical to the terminal form, except that verbs are generally not inflected for politeness; in old Japanese these forms differed. Further, -nominals behave differently in terminal and attributive positions; see Adjectival verbs and nouns, below.
   is used for conditional and subjunctive forms, using the  ending.
   is used to turn verbs into commands. Adjectives do not have an imperative stem form.

The application of conjugative suffixes to stem forms follow certain .

Verbs

 in Japanese are rigidly constrained to the end of a clause. This means that the predicate position is always located at the end of a sentence.

The subject and objects of the verb are indicated by means of particles, and the grammatical functions of the verb (primarily tense and voice) are indicated by means of conjugation. When the subject and the dissertative topic coincide, the subject is often omitted; if the verb is intransitive, the entire sentence may consist of a single verb. Verbs have two tenses indicated by conjugation, past and non-past. The semantic difference between present and future is not indicated by means of conjugation. Usually there is no ambiguity as context makes it clear whether the speaker is referring to the present or future. Voice and aspect are also indicated by means of conjugation, and possibly agglutinating auxiliary verbs. For example, the continuative aspect is formed by means of the continuative conjugation known as the gerundive or  form, and the auxiliary verb ; to illustrate,  → .

Verbs can be semantically classified based on certain conjugations.
These verbs generally do not have a continuative conjugation with  because they are semantically continuative already.
 Continual verbs conjugate with the auxiliary  to indicate the progressive aspect. To illustrate the conjugation,  → .
Example:  → ;  → .
 Non-volitional verb indicate uncontrollable action or emotion. These verbs generally have no volitional, imperative or potential conjugation. Examples: , .
 Movement verbs indicate motion. Examples: , . In the continuative form (see below) they take the particle  to indicate a purpose.
There are other possible classes, and a large amount of overlap between the classes.

Lexically, nearly every verb in Japanese is a member of exactly one of the following three regular conjugation groups (see also Japanese godan and ichidan verbs).
Examples: , .
Examples: , .
  verbs with a stem ending in a consonant.

The "row" in the above classification means a row in the gojūon table. "Upper 1-row" means the row that is one row above the center row (the -row) i.e. i-row. "Lower 1-row" means the row that is one row below the center row (the -row) i.e. -row. "5-row" means the conjugation runs through all 5 rows of the gojūon table. A conjugation is fully described by identifying both the row and the column in the gojūon table.

The  verbs became most of the  verbs in modern Japanese (only a handful of  verbs and a single  verb existed in classical Japanese). The  group was reclassified as the  group during the post-WWII writing reform in 1946, to write Japanese as it is pronounced. Since verbs have migrated across groups in the history of the language, the conjugation of classical verbs cannot be ascertained from knowledge of modern Japanese alone.

Of the irregular classes, there are two:
 -group which has only one member, .
 -group which also has one member, .

The following table illustrates the stem forms of the above conjugation groups, with the root indicated with dots. For example, to find the hypothetical form of the group 1 verb , look in the second row to find its root, then in the hypothetical row to get the ending , giving the stem form . When there are multiple possibilities, they are listed in the order of increasing rarity.

 The  and  irrealis forms for Group 1 verbs were historically one, but since the post-WWII spelling reforms they have been written differently. In modern Japanese the  form is used only for the volitional mood and the  form is used in all other cases; see also the conjugation table below.
 The unexpected ending is due to the verb's root being  but  only being pronounced before  in modern Japanese.

The above are only the stem forms of the verbs; to these one must add various verb endings in order to get the fully conjugated verb. The following table lists the most common conjugations. Note that in some cases the form is different depending on the conjugation group of the verb. See Japanese verb conjugations for a full list.

 This is an entirely different verb;  has no potential form.
 These forms change depending on the final syllable of the verb's dictionary form (whether  etc.). For details, see Euphonic changes, below, and the article Japanese verb conjugation.

Multiple verbal endings can therefore agglutinate. For example, a common formation is the causative-passive ending: .

As should be expected, the vast majority of theoretically possible combinations of conjugative endings are not semantically meaningful.

Transitive and intransitive verbs
Japanese has a large variety of related pairs of transitive verbs (that take a direct object) and intransitive verbs (that do not usually take a direct object), such as the transitive , and the intransitive .

Note: Some intransitive verbs (usually verbs of motion) take what looks like a direct object, but is not. For example, :

Adjectival verbs and nouns

Semantically speaking, words that denote attributes or properties are primarily distributed between two morphological classes (there are also a few other classes):
 – these have roots and conjugating stem forms, and are semantically and morphologically similar to stative verbs.
 – these are nouns that combine with the copula.

Unlike adjectives in languages like English, -adjectives in Japanese inflect for aspect and mood, like verbs.

Every adjective in Japanese can be used in an attributive position, and nearly every Japanese adjective can be used in a predicative position.

 The imperative form is extremely rare in modern Japanese, restricted to set patterns like , where they are treated as adverbial phrases. It is impossible for an imperative form to be in a predicate position.

 Note that these are just forms of the -type adjective 
 Since most adjectives describe non-volitional conditions, the volitional form is interpreted as "it is possible", if sensible. In some rare cases it is semi-volitional:  in response to a report or request.

Adjectives too are governed by euphonic rules in certain cases, as noted in the section on it below. For the polite negatives of -type adjectives, see also the section below on the copula .

Copula
The copula  behaves very much like a verb or an adjective in terms of conjugation.

Note that there are no potential, causative, or passive forms of the copula, just as with adjectives.

The following are some examples.



Historical sound change
 Usually not reflected in spelling

Modern pronunciation is a result of a long history of phonemic drift that can be traced back to written records of the 13th century, and possibly earlier. All earlier texts used the archaic orthography, now referred to as historical kana usage. The adjoining table is a nearly exhaustive list of these spelling changes.

The most basic example of this is modern , which historically developed as  → , via the  →  rule.

A few sound changes are not reflected in the spelling.

Among Japanese speakers, it is not generally understood that the historical kana spellings were, at one point, reflective of pronunciation. For example, the modern  reading  (for ) arose from the historical . The latter was pronounced something like  by the Japanese at the time it was borrowed (compare Middle Chinese ).

Verb conjugations

Conjugations of some verbs and adjectives differ from the prescribed formation rules because of euphonic changes. Nearly all of these euphonic changes are themselves regular. For verbs the exceptions are all in the ending of the continuative form of group when the following auxiliary starts with a -sound (i.e.

* denotes impossible/ungrammatical form.

There is one other irregular change: , for which there is an exceptional continuative form:  +  → ,  +  → , etc.

There are dialectical differences, which are also regular and generally occur in similar situations.

Polite forms of adjectives

This distinction collapsed during the evolution of Late Middle Japanese adjectives, and both are now considered  adjectives. The sound change for  adjectives follows the same rule as for other  adjectives, notably that the preceding vowel also changes and the preceding mora undergoes palatalization, yielding  → , though historically this was considered a separate but parallel rule.

Respectful verbs

Colloquial contractions
In speech, common combinations of conjugation and auxiliary verbs are contracted in a fairly regular manner.

There are occasional others, such as  →  as in  →  and  →  – these are considered quite casual and are more common among the younger generation.

Contractions differ by dialect, but behave similarly to the standard ones given above. For example, in the Kansai dialect,  → .

Other independent words

Adverbs
Adverbs in Japanese are not as tightly integrated into the morphology as in many other languages; adverbs are not an independent class of words, but the role of an adverb is played by other words. For example, every adjective in the continuative form can be used as an adverb; thus,  → . The primary distinguishing characteristic of adverbs is that they cannot occur in a predicate position, just as it is in English. The following classification of adverbs is not intended to be authoritative or exhaustive.
 Verbal adverbs verbs in the continuative form with the particle . E.g.  → , used for instance as: .
 Adjectival adverbs adjectives in the continuative form, as mentioned above. Example:  → 
 Nominal adverbs grammatical nouns that function as adverbs. Example: .
 Sound symbolism words that mimic sounds or concepts.

Often, especially for sound symbolism, the particle  is used. See the article on Japanese sound symbolism.

Conjunctions and interjections
Although called "conjunctions", conjunctions in Japanese are – as their English translations show – actually a kind of adverb:

Interjections in Japanese differ little in use and translation from interjections in English:

Ancillary words

Particles

Particles in Japanese are postpositional, as they immediately follow the modified component. Only a few prominent particles are listed here.

Topic, theme, and subject:   and  

The complex distinction between the so-called topic, and subject, particles has been the theme of many doctoral dissertations and scholarly disputes. The clause  is well known for appearing to contain two subjects. Rather, a more literal translation would be "(speaking of) the elephant, its nose is long"; furthermore, as Japanese does not distinguish between singular and plural the way English does, it could also mean "as for elephants, their noses are long".

Two major scholarly surveys of Japanese linguistics in English, (Shibatani 1990) and (Kuno 1973), clarify the distinction.

The topic marker, is used to declare or to make a statement. The subject marker, is used for new information, or asking for new information.

Thematic 

Opinions differ on the structure of discourse theme, though it seems fairly uncontroversial to imagine a first-in-first-out hierarchy of themes that is threaded through the discourse. However, the usage of this understanding of themes can be limiting when speaking of their scope and depth, and the introduction of later themes may cause earlier themes to expire. In these sorts of sentences, the steadfast translation into English uses constructs like "speaking of X" or "on the topic of X", though such translations tend to be bulky as they fail to use the thematic mechanisms of English. For lack of a comprehensive strategy, many teachers of Japanese emphasize the "speaking of X" pattern without sufficient warning.

A common linguistic joke shows the insufficiency of rote translation with the sentence , which per the pattern would translate as "I am an eel." (or "(As of) me is eel"). Yet, in a restaurant this sentence can reasonably be used to say "My order is eel" (or "I would like to order an eel"), with no intended humour. This is because the sentence should be literally read, "As for me, it is an eel," with "it" referring to the speaker's order. The topic of the sentence is clearly not its subject.

Contrastive 

The suggestive pattern is "X, but…" or "as for X, …".

Because of its contrastive nature, the topic cannot be undefined.

In this use,  is required.

In practice, the distinction between thematic and contrastive  is not that useful. There can be at most one thematic  in a sentence, and it has to be the first  if one exists, and the remaining s are contrastive. The following sentence illustrates the difference;

The first interpretation is the thematic , treating  as the theme of the predicate . That is, if the speaker knows A, B, …, Z, then none of the people who came were A, B, …, Z. The second interpretation is the contrastive . If the likely attendees were A, B, …, Z, and of them the speaker knows P, Q and R, then the sentence says that P, Q and R did not come. The sentence says nothing about A', B', …, Z', all of whom the speaker knows, but none of whom were likely to come. In practice, the first interpretation is the likely one.

Exhaustive 
Unlike , the subject particle  nominates its referent as the sole satisfier of the predicate. This distinction is famously illustrated by the following pair of sentences:

The distinction between each example sentence may be made easier to understand if thought of in terms of the question each statement could answer. The first example sentence could answer the question:

Whereas the second example sentence could answer the question:

Similarly, in a restaurant, if asked by the waitstaff who has ordered the eels, the customer who ordered it could say:

Objective 

There are various common expressions that use verbs in English, often transitive verbs, where the action happens to a specific object: "to be able to do something", "to want something", "to like something", "to dislike something".

Strictly speaking, this label may be misleading, as there is no object in the Japanese constructions.

As an example, the Japanese verb  is often glossed as transitive English verb "to understand".  However, wakaru is an intransitive verb that describes a subject, so a more literal gloss would be "to be understandable".

The direct object of transitive verbs is indicated by the object particle .

This particle can also mean "through" or "along" or "out of" when used with motion verbs:

This particle also has other uses: "at" (temporary location):

"In":

"With" or "in (the span of)":

However,  has additional uses: "at (prolonged)":

"On":

"In (some year)", "at (some point in time)":

To conjoin nouns, と to is used.

The additive particle  can be used to conjoin larger nominals and clauses.

For an incomplete list of conjuncts,  is used.

When only one of the conjuncts is necessary, the disjunctive particle  is used.

This pair can also be used to indicate time or space.
 
 
 You see, I have classes between 9 a.m. and 11 a.m.

Because  indicates starting point or origin, it has a related use as "because", analogously to English "since" (in the sense of both "from" and "because"):

The particle  and a related particle  are used to indicate lowest extents: prices, business hours, etc.

 is also used in the sense of "than".

The particle  is used to set off quotations.

It is also used to indicate a manner of similarity, "as if", "like" or "the way".

In a related conditional use, it functions like "after/when", or "upon".

This last use is also a function of the particle , but  indicates reciprocation which  does not.
 
 
 John and Mary are in love.

 
 
 John loves Mary (but Mary might not love John back).

Finally, the particle  is used in a hortative or vocative sense.

The sentence-final particle  turns a declarative sentence into a question.
 
 
 Are you perchance an American?

Other sentence-final particles add emotional or emphatic impact to the sentence. The particle  softens a declarative sentence, similar to English "you know?", "eh?", "I tell you!", "isn't it?", "aren't you?", etc.
 
 
 You didn't call him up, did you?

 
 
 I hear you're moving to London soon. Is that true?

A final  is used in order to soften insistence, warning or command, which would sound very strong without any final particles.
 
 
 I'm not lying!

They are essentially limited to speech or transcribed dialogue.

Compound particles
Compound particles are formed with at least one particle together with other words, including other particles. The commonly seen forms are:
 particle + verb (term. or cont. or  form)
 particle + noun + particle
 noun + particle

Other structures are rarer, though possible. A few examples:

Auxiliary verbs
All auxiliary verbs attach to a verbal or adjectival stem form and conjugate as verbs. In modern Japanese there are two distinct classes of auxiliary verbs:
   are usually just called verb endings or conjugated forms. These auxiliaries do not function as independent verbs.
   are normal verbs that lose their independent meaning when used as auxiliaries.

In classical Japanese, which was more heavily agglutinating than modern Japanese, the category of auxiliary verb included every verbal ending after the stem form, and most of these endings were themselves inflected. In modern Japanese, however, some of them have stopped being productive.

However, it is considered non-standard.

Much of the agglutinative flavour of Japanese stems from helper auxiliaries, however. The following table contains a small selection of many such auxiliary verbs.

Notes

References

Bibliography

Further reading
 Bloch, Bernard. (1946). Studies in colloquial Japanese I: Inflection. Journal of the American Oriental Society, 66, 97–109.
 Bloch, Bernard. (1946). Studies in colloquial Japanese II: Syntax. Language, 22, 200–248.
 Chafe, William L. (1976). Giveness, contrastiveness, definiteness, subjects, topics, and point of view. In C. Li (Ed.), Subject and topic (pp. 25–56). New York: Academic Press. .
 Jorden, Eleanor Harz, Noda, Mari. (1987). Japanese: The Spoken Language
 Katsuki-Pestemer, Noriko. (2009): A Grammar of Classical Japanese. München: LINCOM. .
 Kiyose, Gisaburo N. (1995). Japanese Grammar: A New Approach. Kyoto: Kyoto University Press. .
 Kuno, Susumu. (1973). The structure of the Japanese language. Cambridge, MA: MIT Press. .
 Kuno, Susumu. (1976). Subject, theme, and the speaker's empathy: A re-examination of relativization phenomena. In Charles N. Li (Ed.), Subject and topic (pp. 417–444). New York: Academic Press. .
 Makino, Seiichi & Tsutsui, Michio. (1986). A dictionary of basic Japanese grammar. Japan Times. 
 Makino, Seiichi & Tsutsui, Michio. (1995). A dictionary of intermediate Japanese grammar. Japan Times. 
 Martin, Samuel E. (1975). A reference grammar of Japanese. New Haven: Yale University Press. .
 McClain, Yoko Matsuoka. (1981). Handbook of modern Japanese grammar: 口語日本文法便覧 [Kōgo Nihon bunpō benran]. Tokyo: Hokuseido Press. ; .
 Mizutani, Osamu; & Mizutani, Nobuko. (1987). How to be polite in Japanese: 日本語の敬語 [Nihongo no keigo]. Tokyo: Japan Times. .
 Shibatani, Masayoshi. (1990). Japanese. In B. Comrie (Ed.), The major languages of east and south-east Asia. London: Routledge. .
 Shibatani, Masayoshi. (1990). The languages of Japan. Cambridge: Cambridge University Press.  (hbk);  (pbk).
 Shibamoto, Janet S. (1985). Japanese women's language. New York: Academic Press. . Graduate Level
 Tsujimura, Natsuko. (1996). An introduction to Japanese linguistics. Cambridge, MA: Blackwell Publishers.  (hbk);  (pbk). Upper Level Textbooks
 Tsujimura, Natsuko. (Ed.) (1999). The handbook of Japanese linguistics. Malden, MA: Blackwell Publishers. . Readings/Anthologies

External links

 FAQ from the Usenet newsgroup sci.lang.japan
 An introduction to Japanese - Syntax, Grammar & Language, online version by Michiel Kamermans
 Tae Kim's Guide to Learning Japanese  – Japanese online grammar guide
 Shoko Hamano, Visualizing Japanese Grammar – animated Japanese grammar lessons from George Washington University
On particles in Japanese